Wang Yue (born 12 February 1997) is a Chinese Paralympic judoka. She won one of the bronze medals in the women's 63 kg event at the 2020 Summer Paralympics held in Tokyo, Japan.

References 

Living people
1997 births
Chinese female judoka
Paralympic judoka of China
Paralympic bronze medalists for China
Paralympic medalists in judo
Judoka at the 2020 Summer Paralympics
Medalists at the 2020 Summer Paralympics
Place of birth missing (living people)
21st-century Chinese women